Chief Julius Momo Udochi was the first Nigerian Ambassador to the United States of America, 1960–1965. He was a Teacher 1931–1938; a Customs Officer in the Nigerian Civil Service 1938–1945; Assistant secretary, Nigerian Secretariat 1945–1947; Hon. Provincial Secretary Nigerian Civil Service Union, Co-Editor "The Nigerian Civil Servant" 1939–1945; Called to the English Bar as a Barrister at Law (Hon. Society of the Middle Temple Inn) in 1950; He practiced Law 1950–1960; was Chairman of the Federal Non-Government Teacher's Salary Commission and a Member of the Mission to the World Bank, 1958; Hon. Secretary of the Nigerian Bar Association and Member of the Committee on Legal Education, 1955–1959; Member of the House of Representatives of Nigeria, 1954-1959 and 1965–1966. First Nigerian Ambassador to the United States of America, 1960–1965; Hon. Attorney-General and Commissioner of Justice, Mid-Western State of Nigeria, 1967–1975.

External links
 "Foreign Embassies in the U.S. and Their Ambassadors"
  "The Conflict Involving Communism in Mid-Africa" Article by Julius Momo Udochi
 "History of Afemai"
Appointment with Pres. Ike - January 6, 1961
Collection: Papers of John F. Kennedy. Presidential Papers. President's Office Files. 

Nigerian diplomats
Ambassadors of Nigeria to the United States
Members of the House of Representatives (Nigeria)
Nigerian schoolteachers